Manny Schwartz is a retired Israeli soccer goalkeeper who played professionally in the North American Soccer League and Major Indoor Soccer League.

Schwartz served in the Israeli Army from 1976 to 1979.  In 1976, he played for the Israeli Olympic soccer team.  In 1978, he played for the Israeli national team during its qualification round for the 1978 FIFA World Cup.  In 1981, Schwartz signed with the Rochester Lancers of the North American Soccer League.  In the fall of 1981, he moved indoors with the St. Louis Steamers of the Major Indoor Soccer League.  He played two seasons with the Steamers, mostly as a backup.  In 1983, he moved to the Kansas City Comets.  He lost much of the 1983-1984 season with a shoulder injury, but in 1984, became the Comets first string goalkeeper.  After outstanding second season with the Comets, Schwartz again lost a good part of the 1985-1986 season with injuries and was waived during the 1986 off season.

References

External links
NASL/MISL stats

1957 births
Living people
Israeli footballers
Maccabi Tel Aviv F.C. players
Rochester Lancers (1967–1980) players
St. Louis Steamers (original MISL) players
Kansas City Comets (original MISL) players
Israeli expatriate footballers
Expatriate soccer players in the United States
Israeli expatriate sportspeople in the United States
Liga Leumit players
Major Indoor Soccer League (1978–1992) players
North American Soccer League (1968–1984) players
Footballers from Haifa
Association football goalkeepers